Charles I d'Albret (December 1368 – 25 October 1415) was the Lord of Albret and the Constable of France from 1402 until 1411, and again from 1413 until 1415. He was also the co-commander of the French army at the Battle of Agincourt where he was killed by the English forces led by King Henry V.

Biography 
Charles was born into an old Gascon family, the son of Arnaud, Lord of Albret, and Margaret de Bourbon. He served under Bertrand du Guesclin as a young man and fought at the battle of Roosebeke. He was made the constable of France by Charles VI in 1403, but dismissed when the Burgundian faction gained power at court. He was restored to his office in 1413 when the Armagnac faction regained power. An important figure at the French court, he is the subject of two of Christine de Pizan's Autres Ballades (#2 and #3).

Although nominal commander of the French army in the Agincourt campaign together with Marshal Boucicaut, the two professional soldiers could not exercise effective control over the higher-ranking French nobles on the day of the battle. Constable d'Albret was killed at Agincourt during the battle on 25 October 1415, against the English troops led by King Henry V. He was interred at the Friary church in Vieil-Hesdin.

Family 
He married Marie de Sully, daughter of Louis de Sully and Isabel de Craon, on 27 January 1400 and had issue:
Jeanne d'Albret (1403–1433), married in 1422 John I, Count of Foix. She was his second wife; the only one of his three wives who bore him issue.
Charles II d'Albret (1407–1471), married Anne of Armagnac (born 1402), the daughter of Bernard VII of Armagnac, Count of Charolais and Bonne of Berry, by whom he had seven children.
Guillaume d'Albret, Lord of Orval, died at the Battle of the Herrings in 1429, no issue
Jean d'Albret, died without issue
Catherine d'Albret, married Charles de Montagu (1363–1409)

Ancestry

See also 
 Albret

References

Bibliography 

1368 births
1415 deaths
People of the Hundred Years' War
French generals
French military personnel killed in action
Counts of Dreux
Charles
Constables of France